The Union of Evangelical Christians-Baptists in Serbia is a fellowship of Baptist churches in Serbia and Montenegro founded in 1992.

The union is a member of the European Baptist Federation. Its office is in Belgrade. In 2000 there were 13 churches with 629 members.

See also
 Union of Baptist Churches in Serbia

References
Baptists Around the World, Albert W. Wardin, editor
 "Union of Evangelical Christians-Baptists in Serbia" at Adherents.com
 "Union of Evangelical Christian Baptist Churches in Serbia and Montenegro" at Baptist World Alliance 

Religious organizations based in Serbia
Baptist denominations in Europe
1992 establishments in Serbia
Protestantism in Serbia